Rogelio Lazaro Valdés Rojas (February 23, 1920 – December 3, 2005) was a Major League Baseball player.

Born in Havana, Cuba, Valdés was  one of many who only appeared in the major leagues during World War II. His career consisted of one at bat as a pinch hitter for the Washington Senators at Fenway Park in Boston on May 3, 1944. He went 0-for-1 for a batting average of .000. He did not appear in the field, so his playing position is unknown.

Valdés died in Miami, Florida, at the age of 85.

Sources

External links
Retrosheet

1920 births
2005 deaths
Washington Senators (1901–1960) players
Major League Baseball players from Cuba
Cuban expatriate baseball players in the United States
People from Havana
Williamsport Grays players
Charlotte Hornets (baseball) players
Chattanooga Lookouts players
Gadsden Pilots players
Tampa Smokers players
Lakeland Pilots players